Jeff Maluleke (born 1977) is a South African musician of the M'nwanati people. Jeff was born to Dora and Johannes Maluleke in the town of Bushbuckridge, Mpumalanga in 1977. In 2002, the Kora All-Africa Music Awards honoured him as the "Revelation of the Year".

He got  signed a record deal with CCP Records in September  1995 and release his album Papa Jeff, with sales over 30 000 units his album was certified gold.

In 2004, at the 10th ceremony of South African Music Awards  he won best male composer for his single "Mambo".

Discography

Albums
 Juliana (EMI, 2000)
 Dzovo (EMI, 2001)
 Kilimanjaro (EMI, 2001)
 Mambo: The Collection (ccp Record Company, 2004)
 Mambo (EMI, 2006)

References

External links
 

1977 births
Living people
People from Bushbuckridge
21st-century South African male singers